The Authentic Life of Billy, the Kid, The Noted Desperado of the Southwest is a biography and partly first-hand account written by Pat Garrett, sheriff of Lincoln County, New Mexico, in collaboration with a ghostwriter, Marshall Ashmun "Ash" Upson.  During the summer of 1881 in a small New Mexican village, Garrett shot and killed the notorious outlaw, William H. Bonney, better known as Billy the Kid.  Due to the first publisher's inability to widely distribute this book beginning in 1882, it sold relatively few copies during Garrett's lifetime.  By the time the fifth publisher purchased the copyright in 1954, this book had become a major reference for historians who have studied the Kid's brief life.  The promotion and distribution of the fifth version of this book to libraries in the United States and Europe sent it into a sixth printing in 1965, and by 1976 it had reached its tenth printing.  For a generation after Sheriff Garrett shot the Kid, his account was considered to be factual, but historians have since found in this book many embellishments and inconsistencies with other accounts of the life of Billy the Kid.

Purpose 
In the weeks that followed the death of Billy the Kid, several articles written mostly in New Mexican newspapers and dime novels  depicted the Kid's death in ways that put Pat Garrett in a bad light.  As the author wrote in his introduction to this biography, "I am incited to this labor, in a measure, by an impulse to correct the thousand false statements which have appeared in the public newspapers and in yellow-covered, cheap novels."  Garrett's purpose comes in two parts; firstly, he wanted to publicly respond to the speculative accusations against him about Billy the Kid's death that were being printed, and secondly, he wanted to set the record straight regarding the more notable incidents that had involved the notorious outlaw beginning with his early life and leading up to his untimely death.  Many people had begun to gossip about the unfairness of Garrett's final encounter with the Kid, so his first reason, which was to clear his name, was decidedly his main purpose.

Still smarting from local outrage in New Mexico over his shooting of the Kid, Garrett wanted to present his side of the story and hoped to turn a profit, as well, on the American public's fascination with the outlaw. Consequently, he published his account of Bonney's life and death in 1882. It was credited to Garrett, but the first 15 chapters were a concoction of factual material mixed with fabrications, written by Roswell's postmaster, Ash Upson, an itinerant journalist. The remaining chapters, written in a more restrained style, are generally accurate, and were likely composed by Garrett himself.

The book failed to find a wide audience, so sold just a few copies; nevertheless, although filled with many errors of fact, The Authentic Life served afterwards as the main source for most books written about the Kid until the 1960s. Thus was established the mythic stature of Pat Garrett as the heroic lawman in pursuit of the villainous but romantic desperado, Billy the Kid.

Ghostwriter 

Garrett, who did not consider himself a writer, called upon his friend, Marshall Ashmun "Ash" Upson, to ghostwrite this book with him.  Ash Upson was an itinerant journalist who had a gift for graphic prose.  Upson and Garrett shared equally in the royalties. As was noted in the introduction to the fifth version of this book:

Good reason exists to believe that the legend of Billy the Kid, including the familiar historical figure he has become, would not be known at all today if this book had not been published.

Versions 

Six versions report Garrett's first-hand account.  Brief descriptions of these qre:
 
 
 
 
 
 
Also, many smaller publishers offer facsimiles of these versions.

See also 

 Brushy Bill Roberts
 Cowboy
 Folklore of the United States
 Lincoln County War
 List of Old West gunfighters
 List of Old West lawmen
 Robert M. Utley
 The Old West: The Gunfighters

Notes

References 
 Tuska, Jon (1983). Billy the Kid: A Handbook. Lincoln, NE: University of Nebraska Press. 
 Utley, Robert M. (1989). Billy the Kid: A Short and Violent Life. Lincoln, NE: University of Nebraska Press.

Further reading 
 Klasner, Lily (1972). My Girlhood Among Outlaws. University of Arizona Press. edited by Eve Ball. 
 Nolan, Frederick (1998). The West of Billy the Kid. Norman, OK: University of Oklahoma Press. 
 Nolan, Frederick (2009). The Lincoln County War, Revised Edition. Santa Fé, NM: Sunstone Press. 
 Nolan, Frederick (2007). Tascosa: Its Life and Gaudy Times. Lubbock, TX: Texas Tech University Press.
 Trachtman, Paul (1974). The Old West: The Gunfighters. New York: Time-Life Books.
 Utley, Robert M. (1987). High Noon In Lincoln. Albuquerque, NM: University of New Mexico Press.

External links 

 The Authentic Life of Billy, The Kid at Arthur's Classic Novels
 

1882 non-fiction books
Billy the Kid
1870s in the United States
American biographies
Works about Billy the Kid
Gunslingers of the American Old West
History of Lincoln County, New Mexico
History of New Mexico
Lawmen of the American Old West
Non-fiction books about outlaws of the American Old West